Yesenia Montilla was born and raised in New York City. A 2014 Cantomundo Fellow, her poetry has appeared in the chapbook for the Crowns of Your Head, as well as the literary journals The Gulf Coast, Prairie Schooner, Pittsburgh Poetry Review, and others.

Career 
Montilla received a BA from Hunter College and an MFA from Drew University in Poetry and Poetry in Translation.

Publications 
The Pink Box, Aquarius Press, 2015.

References 

Living people
21st-century American poets
Year of birth missing (living people)
American women poets
21st-century American women writers
Writers from New York City
Poets from New York (state)
Hunter College alumni
Drew University alumni